Lee Roy Myers (born in Montreal, Quebec) is a Canadian pornographic film director, producer, screenwriter, and one of the creators of WoodRocket.com. He started his career with New Sensations in 2009 and developed their A XXX Parody and Romance Series lines.

He has directed and produced films for Adam & Eve, DreamZone Entertainment, Tom Byron Pictures, Zero Tolerance Entertainment, Hustler, Third Degree Films, Wicked Pictures, Capitol Entertainment Agency, Xenith, Full Spread Entertainment, Nightingale Pictures, Brazzers, Mofos, and his own production company, Goodnight Media.

Filmography

Award nominations
2010 AVN Award nominee – Director of the Year, Body of Work
2010 AVN Award nominee – Best Director, Feature – Seinfeld: A XXX Parody
2010 XBIZ Award nominee – Director of the Year, Body of Work
2010 XBIZ Award nominee – Director of the Year, Individual Project – 30 Rock: A XXX Parody
2011 AVN Award nominee – Director of the Year, Body of Work
2011 AVN Award nominee – Best Director, Feature – The Big Lebowski: A XXX Parody
2011 AVN Award nominee – Best Screenplay, Adapted – The Big Lebowski: A XXX Parody
2011 AVN Award nominee – Best Screenplay, Adapted – Cheers: A XXX Parody
2011 AVN Award nominee – Best Screenplay, Adapted – Reno 911: A XXX Parody
2012 AVN Award nominee - Best Director, Parody - Godfather: A DreamZone Parody
2012 AVN Award nominee - Director of the Year, Body of Work
2013 XBIZ Award nominee - Director of the Year, Parody - Buffy the Vampire Slayer XXX

Award wins
2009 Nightmoves Award winner – Best Parody (Fan Favorite), The Office: A XXX Parody 
2010 AVN Award winner – Best Parody, Sex Files (Producer) 
2010 Nightmoves Award winner – Best Parody (Editor's Choice), The Big Bang Theory: A XXX Parody
2011 XBIZ Award winner - Director of the Year - Body of Work
2011 XBIZ Award winner – Best Parody, The Big Lebowski: A XXX Parody 
2011 XRCO Award winner - Best Parody, Comedy, The Big Lebowski: A XXX Parody

References

External links
Woodrocket.com

Lee Roy Myers on Internet Adult Film Database

Canadian pornographic film directors
Canadian pornographic film producers
Canadian parodists
Parody film directors
Canadian male screenwriters
Living people
Film directors from Montreal
Writers from Montreal
1977 births

21st-century Canadian screenwriters
21st-century Canadian male writers